The canton of Cagnes-sur-Mer-2 is an administrative division of the Alpes-Maritimes department, southeastern France. It was created at the French canton reorganisation which came into effect in March 2015. Its seat is in Cagnes-sur-Mer.

It consists of the following communes:
Cagnes-sur-Mer (partly)
La Gaude 
Saint-Laurent-du-Var

References

Cantons of Alpes-Maritimes